Synne Sofie Kinden Jensen (born 15 February 1996) is a Norwegian professional footballer who plays as a forward for Real Sociedad. She made her debut for the Norway women's national team in 2014.

Club career

Norwegian leagues, 2011–2015 
Jensen played for Gjelleråsen IF as a young teenager. In January 2011 at age 16, she signed with LSK Kvinner FK. She debuted for the club on 14 April 2012 during the club's 6–0 win over SK Trondheims-Ørn in the Toppserien.

In August 2012, she joined Linderud-Grei in the Norwegian First Division. Jensen made 10 appearances for the club and scored 11 goals. She returned to Lillestrøm for the 2013 season where she made eight appearances before committing to league rival Kolbotn IL. Jensen played three seasons for the club. In 2013, she scored five goals in 12 appearances. The following season, she scored 13 goals in 21 appearances. In 2015, she scored six goals in eight appearances.

VfL Wolfsburg, 2015–2016 
At the age of 19, Jensen signed a three-year contract with German club VfL Wolfsburg for the 2015–16 season of the Frauen-Bundesliga. Coach Ralf Kellermann praised her "enormous potential to develop further." On 29 August 2015 she made her competitive debut for Wolfsburg and scored a brace against Jena during the club's season opener, resulting in an 8–0 win.

In June 2016, Wolfsburg sent Jensen on loan to Stabæk for one year, to aid her development with regular first team football. At the end of the season she was allowed to return to Stabæk on a permanent basis, as part of Wolfsburg's transfer deal for Marie Dølvik Markussen.

International career
After representing Norway at the youth international level, Jensen made her senior debut for Norway against New Zealand on 25 November 2014.

International goals

Honours

DFB-Pokal: Winner 2016

References

External links
 
NFF profile 
Wolfsburg profile 

1996 births
Living people
Footballers from Oslo
Kolbotn Fotball players
LSK Kvinner FK players
Toppserien players
Norwegian women's footballers
Norway women's international footballers
Norwegian expatriate women's footballers
VfL Wolfsburg (women) players
Expatriate women's footballers in Germany
Norwegian expatriate sportspeople in Germany
Stabæk Fotball Kvinner players
Women's association football forwards